Gangca County is a county of northeastern Qinghai province, China, on the northern shore of Qinghai Lake. It is under the administration of Haibei Tibetan Autonomous Prefecture.

Geography and climate
Average low temperatures are below freezing from late September to mid May; however, due to the wide diurnal temperature variation, the average high is above freezing from March to November inclusive. Despite frequent rain during summer, when a majority of days sees rain, no month has less than 55% of possible sunshine; with monthly percent possible sunshine ranging from 56% in June to 83% in November, the county seat receives 3,012 hours of bright sunshine annually.

Transport
China National Highway 315

See also
 List of administrative divisions of Qinghai

References

External links

County-level divisions of Qinghai
Haibei Tibetan Autonomous Prefecture